is the term for a traditionally-made Japanese blade (日本刀; nihontō) in the form of a spear, or more specifically, the straight-headed spear.

History

These  are thought to be from the Nara period (710–794). 

The term  appeared for the first time in written sources in 1334, but this type of spear did not become popular until the late 15th century.

The attempted Mongol invasions of Japan in 1274 and 1281 was one of the factors that changed Japanese weaponry and warfare. The Mongols employed Chinese and Korean footmen wielding long pikes and fought in tight formations. They moved in large units to stave off cavalry. Polearms (including  and ) were of much greater military use than swords, due to their significantly longer reach, lighter weight per unit length (though overall a polearm would be fairly hefty), and their great piercing ability. 

In the Nanbokuchō period, battles on foot by groups became the mainstream and the importance of  further increased, but  were not yet the main weapon.

Around the latter half of the 16th century,  holding pikes with length of  became the main forces in armies. They formed lines, combined with soldiers bearing firearms tanegashima and short spears. Pikemen formed a two- or three-row line, and were trained to move their pikes in unison under command. Not only  but also samurai fought on the battlefield with yari as one of their main weapons. For example, Honda Tadakatsu was famous as a master of one of The Three Great Spears of Japan, the Tonbokiri (蜻蛉切). One of The Three Great Spears of Japan, the Nihongō (:ja:日本号) was treasured as a gift, and its ownership changed to Emperor Ogimachi, Shogun Ashikaga Yoshiaki, Oda Nobunaga, Toyotomi Hideyoshi, Fukushima Masanori, and so on, and has been handed down to the present day.

With the coming of the Edo period the  had fallen into disuse. Greater emphasis was placed on small-scale, close quarters combat, so the convenience of swords led to their dominance, and polearms and archery lost their practical value. During the peaceful Edo period,  were still produced (sometimes even by renowned swordsmiths), although they existed mostly as either a ceremonial weapon or as a police weapon.

Description

The blades were made of the same steel from which traditional Japanese swords and arrowheads were forged, and were very durable. Throughout history many variations of the straight  blade were produced, often with protrusions on a central blade.  blades often had an extremely long tang (中心); typically it would be longer than the sharpened portion of the blade. The tang protruded into a reinforced hollow portion of the handle ( or ) resulting in a very stiff shaft making it nearly impossible for the blade to fall or break off.

The shaft ( or ) came in many different lengths, widths, and shapes; made of hardwood and covered in lacquered bamboo strips, these came in oval, round, or polygonal cross section. These in turn were often wrapped in metal rings or wire, and affixed with a metal pommel (石突) on the butt end.  shafts were often decorated with inlays of metal or semiprecious materials such as brass pins, lacquer, or flakes of pearl. A sheath (鞘) was also part of a complete .

Variations of  blades

Various types of  points or blades existed. The most common blade was a straight, flat design that resembles a straight-bladed double edged dagger. This type of blade could cut as well as stab and was sharpened like a razor edge.
  have a point that resembles a narrow spike with a triangular cross-section. A  therefore had no cutting edge, only a sharp point at the end. The  was therefore best suited for penetrating armor, even armor made of metal, which a standard yari was not as suited to.
 , a blade with a diamond shaped cross section.
  were mounted to a shaft by means of a metal socket instead of a tang. The socket and blade are forged from a single piece.
  had a very broad, "spade-shaped" head.  often had a pair of holes centering the two ovoid halves.

 , also called , looked something similar to a trident or partisan, and brandished a pair of curved blades around its central lance.
  gets its name from a peasant weapon called  (lit. "sickle" or "scythe"). 

  had a weapon design sporting a blade that was two-pronged. Instead of being constructed like a military fork, a straight blade (as in ) was intersected just below its midsection by a perpendicular blade. This blade was slightly shorter than the primary, had curved tips making a parallelogram, and was set off center so that only 1/6 of its length extended on the other side. This formed a rough 'L' shape.
  barely looked like a spear at all. A polearm that had a crescent blade for a head, which could be used for slashing and hooking.
  was a key-shaped spear with a long blade with a side hook much like that found on a fauchard. This could be used to catch another weapon, or even dismount a rider on horseback.
  possessed some of the most ornate designs for any spear. Running parallel to the long central blade were two 'crescent moon' shaped blades facing outwards. They were attached in two locations by short cross bars, making the head look somewhat like a fleur-de-lis.
 , an old form of  possibly from the Nara period (710–794), a guard's spear with  pole and  blade either leaf-shaped or waved (like keris); a sickle-shaped horn projected on one or both sides at the joint of blade. The  had a hollow socket like the later period  for the pole to fit into rather than a long tang.
 , a broad  described as being "leaf shaped" or "bamboo leaf shaped".
  (alao known as ), a straight double edged blade.
 , an extra long  blade.

Variations of  shafts

It was especially used by Oda clan  beginning from the reign of Oda Nobunaga; samurai tradition of the time held that the soldiers of the rural province of Owari were among the weakest in Japan. Kantō was a chaotic place; Kansai was home to the Shogunate, and the Uesugi, Takeda, Imagawa, and Hojo clans, as well as pirate raiders from Shikoku. Additionally, Kyushu was home of one of the most warmongering clans in Japan, the Shimazu clan. Because of this, Nobunaga armed his underperforming  soldiers extra-long pikes in order for them to be more effective against armoured opponents and cavalry, and fighting in groups and formations.
 . The shaft goes through a hollow metal tube that allowed the spear to be twisted during thrusting.
 . A  with a short simple shaft that was kept by the bedside for home protection.
 . A  with a short shaft that was used by samurai and police to help capture criminals.

Gallery

Popular culture
 Teenage Mutant Ninja Turtles features yari spears being used by the Shredder in the 1990 film and the 2014 film. One was also used by Jei, a wolf sorcerer in the 2012 TV series.
 Power Rangers Samurai features the Green Ranger Mike Fernandez using the Forest Spear which is themed on a yari.
 Sengoku Basara franchise features Sanada Yukimura uses a red yari as main weapon throughout the franchise.
 In the game Sekiro: Shadows Die Twice a boss called Seven Ashina Spears - Shikibu Toshikatsu Yamauchi wields a yari.

See also
 Japanese sword
 Three Great Spears of Japan
 Nunti Bo
 Naginata

References

External links

 Nihonto message board forum
 Richard Stein's Japanese sword guide

Spears of Japan
Blade weapons
Samurai polearms